FC Baikal Irkutsk was a Russian football team from Irkutsk, founded in 2009.  It was relegated from the second-tier FNL back to PFL at the end of the 2015–16 season, but it did not receive a professional license for the 2016–17 season and thus folded, with its spot taken by FC Zenit Irkutsk. It was called FC Radian-Baikal Irkutsk before June 2012.

In 2015, Baikal's promotion to the Russian National Football League marked the return to the second level of Russian football by a club from Irkutsk for the first time in seven years.

History

League and cup history

The management and staff of the club
 President- Lydryk Oleg
 CEO- Vadim Vdovichenko
 Chief Coach- Dmitry Petrenko
 Coach- Vyacheslav Rudakov Yurevych
 Goalkeeper Coach- Sergey Barkalov
 Press Officer- Michael Alekseevych Klimov

References

Football clubs in Russia
Association football clubs established in 2009
Sport in Irkutsk
2009 establishments in Russia